Norwood is an unincorporated community in Nelson County, Virginia, United States.  It was among the communities severely affected by flash flooding from Hurricane Camille in 1969.

Montezuma was listed on the National Register of Historic Places in 1980.

References

Unincorporated communities in Nelson County, Virginia
Unincorporated communities in Virginia